Saint Joseph's College of Maine is a private Catholic college in Standish, Maine. It is the only Catholic college in Maine.

Saint Joseph's was founded by the Sisters of Mercy in 1912. The college, run by a lay and religious Board of Trustees, was located on the convent grounds in nearby Portland until 1956 when it moved to its lakeside location in Standish. In 1970, Saint Joseph's became coeducational and six years later began a distance education program for working adults. Saint Joseph's College Online offers its online programs to 2,400 students in 50 states and nine countries.

Academics
On campus, the college offers more than 40 majors, minors and partnership programs. The average class size is 14. The student-to-faculty ratio is 11:1. On campus, the college offers undergraduate programs in the liberal arts and sciences, as well as professional programs. The most popular majors are nursing, business, education, exercise science/sports management, and biology.

Through Saint Joseph's College Online, there are roughly 2,400 students enrolled  in more than 30 academic programs leading to bachelor's and master's degrees, as well as associate degrees and certificates. Support for students includes counselors, advisors, online tutors, an IT help desk, and financial aid. Students also have the option to take courses on campus during the summer.

Accreditation and approvals
The college is accredited by the New England Commission of Higher Education. The nursing program is also approved by the Maine State Board of Nursing and accredited by the Commission on Collegiate Nursing Education. The Elementary Education and Physical Education majors and the Secondary Education minor are approved by the state of Maine.

Student life

Honor Societies
Delta Epsilon Sigma, a national scholastic honor society for students of Catholic colleges and universities, has been at Saint Joseph's College since 1950.
Sigma Theta Tau International is the nursing honor society and exists to promote the development, dissemination and utilization of nursing knowledge. Sigma Theta Tau is committed to improving the health of people worldwide through increasing the scientific base of nursing practice. The Kappa Zeta Chapter-at-large of Sigma Theta Tau was chartered at Saint Joseph's College in April 1988.

Athletics
Saint Joseph's College teams are known as the Monks. The college fields NCAA Division III sport in soccer, track and field, volleyball (women only), swimming, basketball, golf, field hockey, baseball, softball, lacrosse, and cross country. The college is a member of the Great Northeast Athletic Conference (GNAC), the Eastern College Athletic Conference (ECAC). Intramural teams include everything from basketball to bowling; club sports include dance team, cheerleading, ice hockey and ultimate Frisbee. The athletic center is equipped with a full gym, indoor track, pool, and dance/aerobics room.
The 2012 SJC baseball team was ranked 14th in the country in the DIII NCAA ranking. The baseball rankings for the 2013 season was projecting SJC at 12th in the country. With a win against #1 Wheaton College, the Monks moved up to #9 in the country.

Housing
Eleven residence halls exist.

Notable alumni

Writing, Journalism, Television
Randy Freer (1982). Former President of FOX Sports Network, current CEO of Hulu
Pat DeCola (2009). Writer, FOXSports.com
Andrea Gibson. Slam Poet, Activist

Sports
Charlie Furbush. Pitcher, Seattle Mariners

Education
Robert Caret. President of the University of Massachusetts (2012–14) Chancellor of the University of Maryland system (2014–present (2017))
Marilyn Lacey. religious sister, Director, and founder of Mercy Beyond Borders; In 2001 she was honored by the Dalai Lama as an “Unsung Hero of Compassion”, for her life of service with refugees.

Politics
Bonnie Newman. Politics and Education

See also
Timeline of women's colleges in the United States
Great Northeast Athletic Conference
North Atlantic Conference
List of NCAA Division III institutions
Harold Alfond
Frank Fixaris

References

External links
Official website
Official athletics website

 
Sisters of Mercy colleges and universities
Educational institutions established in 1912
Universities and colleges in Cumberland County, Maine
Standish, Maine
Catholic universities and colleges in Maine
Former women's universities and colleges in the United States
Roman Catholic Diocese of Portland
1912 establishments in Maine
Private universities and colleges in Maine
History of women in Maine